Titus Sextius was a Roman governor of Africa from 42 until 40 BC.

Titus Sextius may also refer to:
Titus Sextius Africanus (suffect consul 59)
Titus Sextius Magius Lateranus (consul 94)
Titus Sextius Cornelius Africanus (consul 112)
Titus Sextius Lateranus (consul 154)
Titus Sextius Magius Lateranus (consul 197)